Cusco (also often spelled Cuzco) is the Inca capital in modern Peru and the most populous city in the Andes.

Cusco or cuzco may also refer to:

Places
Cusco

 Cusco Region, geographic and political region in Peru with Cusco city as its capital 
 Cusco Province, province in the Cusco Region
 Cusco District, district in Cusco Province

Cuzco

 Cuzco (Madrid Metro), a station on Line 10
 Cuzco, Indiana, a small town in the United States

Others
 Cusco (band), a German cross-cultural new age band named after the Inca capital city.
 CUSCO Japan, Japanese automotive suspensions parts company

See also

 
 Kuzco, a fictional character from the movie The Emperor's New Groove
 Cosco (disambiguation)
 CUS (disambiguation), including companies called CUS